Haurakia is a genus of minute sea snails, marine gastropod mollusks or micromollusks in the family Rissoidae.

Species
 Haurakia africana  (Thiele, 1925)
 Haurakia amica  (Thiele, 1925)
 Haurakia angulata (Hedley, 1907)
 Haurakia aupouria (Powell, 1937)
 Haurakia averni (Ponder & Worsfold, 1994)
 † Haurakia buccella Marwick, 1931 
 † Haurakia chemnitzia Laws, 1948 
 Haurakia crassicosta Powell, 1955
 Haurakia denseclathrata  (Thiele, 1925)
 Haurakia discrepans (Tate & May, 1900)
 Haurakia finlayi Powell, 1937
 Haurakia gilva (W. H. Turton, 1932)
 Haurakia hamiltoni (Suter, 1898)
 Haurakia hertzogi  (Thiele, 1925)
 Haurakia huttoni (Suter, 1898)
 Haurakia imitator (Thiele, 1930)
 Haurakia infecta (Suter, 1908)
 Haurakia latiambita (Ponder, 1967)
 Haurakia marmorata (Hedley, 1907)
 † Haurakia marshalli (Grant-Mackie & Chapman-Smith, 1971) 
 Haurakia mediolaevis Cotton, 1944
 Haurakia minuscula Powell, 1955
 Haurakia mobilicosta (Ponder, 1967)
 Haurakia novarensis (Frauenfeld, 1867)
 † Haurakia oamarutica Finlay, 1924 
 Haurakia occulta  (Thiele, 1925)
 † Haurakia onerata Laws, 1939 
 Haurakia otagoensis Dell, 1956
 Haurakia pellucida (Powell, 1937)
 Haurakia praeda (Hedley, 1908)
 Haurakia profundior (Hedley, 1907)
 Haurakia relativa (Laseron, 1956)
 Haurakia semireticulata (Murdoch & Suter, 1906)
 Haurakia sinuastoma (Ponder, 1967)
 † Haurakia sodalis Laws, 1939 
 Haurakia subsuturalis Dell, 1956
 Haurakia sufflava (Cecalupo & Perugia, 2009)
 † Haurakia tenuisculpta Laws, 1950 
 Haurakia wallacei (W. R. B. Oliver, 1915)
Synonyms
 Haurakia aupouria Powell, 1937: synonym of Alvania (Linemera) aupouria (Powell, 1937) represented as Alvania aupouria (Powell, 1937)
 † Haurakia basispiralis Chapman-Smith & Grant-Mackie, 1971: synonym of † Diala basispiralis (Chapman-Smith & Grant-Mackie, 1971) : synonym of † Diala semistriata (Philippi, 1849)
 Haurakia bountyensis Dell, 1950: synonym of Alvania (Linemera) bountyensis (Dell, 1950) represented as Alvania bountyensis (Dell, 1950) (original combination)
 Haurakia duplicata Powell, 1937: synonym of Onoba (Ovirissoa) duplicata (Powell, 1937) represented as Onoba duplicata (Powell, 1937)
 Haurakia firma Laseron, 1956: synonym of Alvania novarensis Frauenfeld, 1867: synonym of Haurakia novarensis (Frauenfeld, 1867) (Junior subjective synonym)
 Haurakia formosita Laseron, 1956: synonym of Alvania novarensis Frauenfeld, 1867: synonym of Haurakia novarensis (Frauenfeld, 1867) (Junior subjective synonym)
 Haurakia isolata Laseron, 1956: synonym of Alvania isolata (Laseron, 1956)
 Haurakia kermadecensis W. R. B. Oliver, 1915: synonym of Alvania kermadecensis (W. R. B. Oliver, 1915)
 Haurakia liddelliana (Hedley, 1907): synonym of Parashiela liddelliana (Hedley, 1907) (Does not belong to Haurakia)
 Haurakia lucida Laseron, 1950: synonym of Chrysallida lucida (Laseron, 1950)
 † Haurakia mixta Finlay, 1924: synonym of † Pisinna impressa (Hutton, 1885)
 Haurakia venusta Powell, 1926: synonym of Alvania venusta (Powell, 1926) (original combination)

References

  Laseron, C. F. (1956). The families Rissoinidae and Rissoidae (Mollusca) from the Solanderian and Dampierian zoogeographical provinces. Australian Journal of Marine and Freshwater Research. 7 (3): 384–484.
 Ponder, W. F. (1967). The classification of the Rissoidae and Orbitestellidae with descriptions of some new taxa. Transactions of the Royal Society of New Zealand, Zoology. 9(17): 193–224, pls 1–13.

External links
 Iredale, T. (1915). A commentary on Suter's Manual of the New Zealand Mollusca. Transactions and Proceedings of the New Zealand Institute. 47: 417-497
 Powell, A. W. B. (1937). New species of marine Mollusca from New Zealand. Discovery Reports. 15: 153–222, pls 45–56

Rissoidae
Gastropod genera